AMD FirePro was AMD's brand of graphics cards designed for use in workstations and servers running professional Computer-aided design (CAD), Computer-generated imagery (CGI), Digital content creation (DCC), and High-performance computing/GPGPU applications. The GPU chips on FirePro-branded graphics cards are identical to the ones used on Radeon-branded graphics cards. The end products (i.e. the graphics card) differentiate substantially by the provided graphics device drivers and through the available professional support for the software. The product line is split into two categories: "W" workstation series focusing on workstation and primarily focusing on graphics and display, and "S" server series focused on virtualization and GPGPU/High-performance computing.

The release of the Radeon Pro Duo in April 2016 and the announcement of the Radeon Pro WX Series in July 2016 marked the succession of Radeon Pro as AMD's professional workstation graphics card solution. Radeon Instinct is the current brand for servers.

Competitors included Nvidia's Quadro-branded and to an extent, Nvidia Tesla-branded product series and Intel's Xeon Phi-branded products.

History
The FireGL line was originally developed by the German company Spea Software AG until it was acquired by Diamond Multimedia in November 1995. The first FireGL board used the 3Dlabs GLINT 3D processor chip.

Deprecated brand names are ATI FireGL, ATI FirePro 3D, and AMD FireStream.

In July 2016, AMD announced it would be replacing the FirePro brand with Radeon Pro for workstations. The new brand for servers is Radeon Instinct.

Features

Multi-monitor support 

AMD Eyefinity can support multi-monitor set-ups. One graphics card can drive up to a maximum of six monitors; the supported number depends on the distinct product and the number of DisplayPort displays. The device driver facilitates the configuration of diverse display group modes.

Differences with the Radeon Line

The FirePro line is designed for compute intensive, multimedia content creation (such as video editors), and mechanical engineering design software (such as CAD programs). Their Radeon counterparts are suited towards video games and other consumer applications. Because they use the same drivers (Catalyst) and are based on the same architectures and chipsets, the major differences are essentially limited to price and double-precision performance. However, some FirePro cards may have major feature differences to the equivalent Radeon card, such as ECC RAM and differing physical display outputs.

Since the 2007 series, high-end and ultra-end FireGL/FirePro products (based on the R600 architecture) have officially implemented stream processing. The Radeon line of video cards, although present in hardware, did not offer any support for stream processing until the HD 4000 series where beta level OpenCL 1.0 support is offered, and the HD 5000 series and later, where full OpenCL 1.1 support is offered.

Heterogeneous System Architecture
HSA is intended to facilitate the programming for stream processing and/or GPGPU in combination with CPUs and DSPs. All models implementing the Graphics Core Next microarchitecture support hardware features defined by the HSA Foundation and AMD has provided corresponding software.

FirePro DirectGMA 

 GPUOpen: Professional Compute is no longer on GPUOpen

Soft-mods
Because of the similarities between FireGL and Radeon cards, some users soft-mod their Radeon cards by using third-party software or automated scripts accompanied with a modified FireGL driver patch, to allow FireGL capabilities for their hardware, effectively getting a cheaper, equivalent, FireGL cards, often with better OpenGL capabilities, but usually half of the amount of video memory. Some variants can also be soft-modded to a FireStream stream processor.

The trend of soft-mods was continued with the 2007 series FireGL cards, as follows:

Products

Workstation

Pre-ATI FireGL cards

FireGL Series 

1 Vertex shaders : Pixel shaders : Texture mapping units : Render output units
2 Unified shaders : Texture mapping units : Render output units : Compute Units

FireMV (Multi-View) Series 

1 Vertex shaders : Pixel shaders : Texture mapping unit : Render output units
2 Unified shaders : Texture mapping unit : Render output units

FirePro (Multi-View) Series

FirePro 3D Series (V000) 

1 Unified shaders : Texture mapping units : Render output units : Compute Units
2 The effective data transfer rate of GDDR5 is quadruple its nominal clock, instead of double as it is with other DDR memory
3  Windows 7, 8.1, 10 Support for Fire Pro Cards with Terascale 2 and later by firepro driver 15.301.2601

FirePro Series (Vx900) 

1 Unified shaders : Texture mapping units : Render output units : Compute Units
2 The effective data transfer rate of GDDR5 is quadruple its nominal clock, instead of double as it is with other DDR memory.
3 Support for Windows 7, 8.1 for OpenGL 4.4 and OpenCL 2.0, when Hardware is prepared with firepro driver 14.502.1045

FirePro Workstation Series (Wx000) 
 Vulkan 1.0 and OpenGL 4.5 possible for GCN with Driver Update FirePro equal to Radeon Crimson 16.3 or higher.
 Vulkan 1.1 possible for GCN with Radeon Pro Software 18.Q1.1 or higher. It might not fully apply to GCN 1.0 or 1.1 GPUs.

1 Unified shaders : Texture mapping units : Render output units : Compute Units
2 The effective data transfer rate of GDDR5 is quadruple its nominal clock, instead of double as it is with other DDR memory.
3 OpenGL 4.4: support with AMD FirePro driver release 14.301.000 or later, in footnotes of specs

FirePro D-Series 

In 2013, AMD released the D-Series specifically for Mac Pro workstations.

1 Unified shaders : Texture mapping units : Render output units : compute units

FirePro Workstation Series (Wx100) 
 Vulkan 1.0 and OpenGL 4.5 possible for GCN with Driver Update FirePro equal to Radeon Crimson 16.3 or higher. OpenCL 2.1 and 2.2 possible for all OpenCL 2.0-Cards with Driver Update in Future (Khronos). Linux Support for OpenCL is limited with AMDGPU Driver 16.60 actual to Version 1.2.
 Vulkan 1.1 possible for GCN with Radeon Pro Software 18.Q1.1 or higher. It might not fully apply to GCN 1.0 or 1.1 GPUs.
 OpenGL 4.6 is available in 18.Q2 (or later) analog to Adrenalin 18.4.1.

1 Unified shaders : Texture mapping units : Render output units : compute units
2 The effective data transfer rate of GDDR5 is quadruple its nominal clock, instead of double as it is with other DDR memory.
3 OpenGL 4.4: support with AMD FirePro driver release 14.301.000 or later, in footnotes of specs

FirePro Workstation Series (Wx300) 
 Vulkan 1.1 possible for GCN with Radeon Pro Software 18.Q1.1 or higher. It might not fully apply to GCN 1.0 or 1.1 GPUs.

Mobile Workstation

Mobility FireGL Series

FirePro Mobile Series

Server

FireStream Series

FirePro Remote Series 

1 Unified shaders : Texture mapping units : Render output units : compute units
2 The effective data transfer rate of GDDR5 is quadruple its nominal clock, instead of double as it is with other DDR memory.

FirePro Server Series (S000x/Sxx 000) 
 Vulkan 1.0 and OpenGL 4.5 possible for GCN with Driver Update FirePro equal to Radeon Crimson 16.3 or higher. OpenGL 4.5 was only in Windows available. Actual Linux Driver support OpenGL 4.5 and Vulkan 1.0, but only OpenCL 1.2 by AMDGPU Driver 16.60.
 Vulkan 1.1 possible for GCN with Radeon Pro Software 18.Q1.1 or higher. It might not fully apply to GCN 1.0 or 1.1 GPUs.
 OpenGL 4.6 is available in 18.Q2 (or later) analog to Adrenalin 18.4.1.

1 Unified shaders : Texture mapping units : Render output units: Compute units
2 The effective data transfer rate of GDDR5 is quadruple its nominal clock, instead of double as it is with other DDR memory.
3 OpenGL 4.4: support with AMD FirePro driver release 14.301.000 or later, in footnotes of specs

Radeon Sky Series 

1 Unified shaders : Texture mapping units : Render output units : compute units
2 The effective data transfer rate of GDDR5 is quadruple its nominal clock, instead of double as it is with other DDR memory.

See also
 Nvidia Quadro – Nvidia's competing workstation graphics solution
 Nvidia Tesla – Nvidia's competing GPGPU solution
 Xeon Phi - Intel's competing High-performance computing solution
 List of AMD graphics processing units

References

External links
 AMD FirePro Professional Graphics

AMD graphics cards
Graphics cards